Black Colt (Persian: Korre-ye-Siyah) is an Iranian folktale published by author Forough Hekmat in 1974. It is classified in the international Aarne-Thompson-Uther Index as ATU 314, "Goldener".

Although it differs from variants wherein a hero acquires golden hair, its starting sequence (persecution by the hero's stepmother) is considered by scholarship as an alternate opening to the same tale type.

Summary
In a land to the East of Persia, a king rules with his beautiful wife. She bears him a son they name Malik Khorsheed ("The Sun Prince"). His destiny is foretold to be an unhappy one. He grows up to be a fine horseman and great archer.

One day, his mother dies, and the boy falls into a deep sadness. To appease the boy's grief, the king's viziers tells the king a dervish has come to the palace to bring a gift to the prince: a black colt with a star on its head. The prince takes the horse - which he named Korreh-ę-Siyah ("Black Colt") - as his friend and companion, and spends the days riding the horse after his studies.

Years pass, and the king marries another queen. The queen begins to despise her step-son, because her husband spends most of his time with the boy, and begins to plot against him. Black Colt senses that the new queen is secretly harbouring ill-will towards the boy, and warns him to be on his guard for any attempt on his life. Malik Khorsheed dismisses the colt's warnings, but heeds the words.

And so the queen begins her plans: she orders some servants to dig up a hole on the way to the stables and fill it with branches. Malik Khorsheed escapes the first attempt by taking another path to the stables, and because the colt warned him. The next time, the queen brings some poisoned food to his room, but the colt warned him not to eat any food she gives him.

The queen, then, plots to destroy the only thing the boy loves more than his father, the horse. With the help from her Qamar Vizir, she feigns illness and her personal doctor advises a three-day diet from the meat of  black horse. After hearing this, the shah is in a dilemma: to save his queen, whose life is more valuable than an animal, he must kill the horse and deeply hurt his own son. He decides on killing the colt, and finding another horse for his son.

Malik Khorsheed goes to the stables and talks to his Black Colt, which talks to him about the grim fate that awaits it, on the very orders of his father, the shah. Black Colt reveals the new queen's deception, and laments that the boy could not do convince his father to the contrary. The horse, however, concocts a plan: the next day, when the clock strikes ten, the horse will neigh to draw his attention, and Malik Khorsheed must leave school, and ask his father for one last ride on the horse.

The next day, the colt is guided to the sacrifice, to the queen's delight. Meanwhile, Malik Khorsheed escapes from his mentor's classes by throwing a handful of ashes on his mouth to stop him, and runs to the palace's gardens, but reaches the wrong side. He jumps over a low wall and runs to his horse. He stops the execution in the nick of time and demands an explanation from the servants. The servants explain that the shah, his father, ordered the horse's execution for the sake of the queen's health. Saddened, the prince asks them to allow him a last ride on the horse.

The guards and servants give him a bridle and a saddle. Malik Khorsheed mounts the horse and they escape from the palace by jumping aloft, high in the air. The shah and the queen watch the whole scene as rider and mount disappear into the air, far away from the kingdom.

Malik Khorsheed and the Black Colt watch the whole world in their aerial flight, passing through mountains and valleys, even the peaks of "purple Elburz Mountains". They finally land in the lands of the Shah of Western Persia, and the Black Colt tells him that they must depart for a while, but the animal will help him: it lets the prince take some hairs from its tail, which he can use to summon him by burning them. Black Colt also advises the prince to hide his royal clothes and to find a new identity in this new land, then departs.

Malik Khorsheed follows the horse's instructions and hides the royal garments in a saddlebag, then asks a goatherd on the road for a goat's stomach to wear as a cap, so that he appears to be bald. He reaches the city of the Shah of Western Persia and finds work as the apprentice of the shah's gardener, tending to the flowers of the royal gardens.

At certain times, the weather is so hot that people take a nap in the afternoon, and Malik Khorsheed takes the opportunity to ride the Black Colt while no one is paying attention. So he burns the horse's hairs to summon it, rides it for a while, then returns to his daily duties.

One day, he gives a suggestion to the gardener if he can redesign the garden's flower-beds. He does and so impressive they look that they become the people's talk. Another task the boy does is to bring bouquets for the three princesses along with a written poem for each of them. The youngest princess, beautiful Peri-zaad ("Fairy-born"), decides to look into the recent changes in her father's garden, and goes down to the garden to inquire the gardener. The old gardener replies to the princess that his new apprentice is responsible for the changes. The princess amazes at the boy's sensibility, despite his strange and ugly looks.

She then talks to the gardener's apprentice, the baldheaded boy, who is tending some flowers in the garden. As the princess talks to him, he notices her great beauty, but regains his composture and tells her he is a friendless youth who wandered into her father's city. Intrigued by the gardener's manners, the princess returns to talk to him, and she begins to pine for the lowly boy.

Some time later, the princesses' marriageability is assessed by analysing the ripeness of three melons. The king then summons all noble-born youths to his palace for his three daughters to choose their husbands by throwing a red apple to their suitor of choice. Peri-zaad looks to the crowd of assembled noblemen in hopes of seeing the gardener, but he is not there. Her elders sisters choose the sons of the Vizier of the Right Hand and the Vizier of the Left Hand for their husband, while Peri-zaad tries to hold on to hers for a bit longer.

The shah grows impatient with his daughter's indecision, and secretly orders the guards to bring every youth in the city. The guards first stop by the garden to bring the gardener's apprentice to the palace. As soon as the boy appears the royal chambers, the princess is delighted at his arrival, and tosses her red apple to him, much to her father's horror at her choosing a lowly man as her husband.

The shah congratulates his two elder daughter and banishes Peri-zaad from the palace for this affront, as well as strips her of her royal rank and privileges. Peri-zaad seems happy with her choice, even if Malik notices that she sacrificed her royal status for him. Malik questions her decision, but the princess answers he was her choice, and goes to live with him in his shabby cottage.

Some time into their marriage life, Malik rides Black Colt away from the cottage, but Peri-zaad sees her husband in the distance as if he is a completely different man. When he returns from his secret ride, the princess inquires him about his origins, and he tells her everything: the horse's help, his step-mother's plans, and his flight to her father's kingdom. They agree to keep it his true identity a secret for now before it arises any suspicions.

Some time later, the princess's nurse goes to Malik's cottage to tell her about her father's illness, and how his two sons-in-law are hunting for venison to use in a healing broth. Peri-zaad then asks her husband to ride Black Colt and find deer for her father. Meanwhile, the two other sons-in-law ride as far away to Eastern Persia and find a herd of deer. They see that the deers are grazing near a splendid tent, which they learn belongs to Shah-zadeh Malik Khorsheed.

The two princes are brought to Malik's presence and they do not recognize him the gardener's apprentice. The duo tell him they are looking for a cure for their king. Malik agrees to let them take some venison from his herds, but in exchange they will allow him to brand them as his slaves. Both men are perplexed at first, but, thinking no one will ever know beyond the three of them, they consent to be branded and take the venison back to Western Persia.

Malik thanks his loyal horse, Black Colt, for the idea, and rides it back to his wife before the other. He arrives at his cottage and gives her the venison to prepare a broth for her father. Moments later, the two other princes arrive with the deer meat and prepare them. Three bowls with broth are brought before the king: the first one tasteless, the second one heavily seasoned, but the third, by Peri-zaad and Malik, on point. He eats the broth with meat her daughter brought and asks his guards to bring her to him.

The guards go to the gardener's cottage, but do not find neither the princess nor her husband. They decide to leave the palace to begin a search for them all around the country, but as soon as they leave the palace gates, they see a magnificent palace just two miles from the shah's own: Qasr-e-zar-negaar ("The Gold-Pictured Palace"). Certainly - they think - a fairy prince has come to visit them.

The shah is alerted of this and receives their guest with the appropriate pomp. Their guest, Shah-zadeh Malik Khorsheed, enters his father-in-law's palace in regal garments and riding on Black Colt. In the royal chambers, he explains he has come to get his two slaves, the shah's two sons-in-law. The shah does not understand the motive of the prince's visit, until he summons his sons-in-law and they disrobe to show the slave brands.

Malik Khorsheed then invites the shah to his palace, Qasr-e-zar-negaar, for a banquet, where they are to discuss the delivery of the two slaves to him. The shah agrees and the next day he goes with a retinue of courtiers to Qasr-e-zar-negaar. Every room they enter, they admire the exquisite architecture and craftmanship, until they reach the throne room. Malik Khorsheed arrives with a veiled Peri-zaad at his side. The princess makes a bow before her father and lifts her veil to show her face to him.

The shah rejoices at seeing his daughter again, and learns of Malik Khorsheed's whole story. The shah begs for their forgiveness, and embraces Malik as his son-in-law. However, Malik tells him he still misses his homeland, in Eastern Persia, and wishes to bring his wife, Peri-zaad, with him. The shah is sad to part with his daughter, by gives the couple his blessing and they depart the next morning on Black Colt, flying all the way from Western Persia to Eastern Persia.

Back in Eastern Persia, Malik's father has been mourning his son after his departure, and banished his wicked new wife on a horse. A servant comes to him with the strangest news: a flying horse is coming to their kingdom! Hearing this, the king hopes - and prays - it is Black Colt, bringing home his son. The horse lands in the palace's gardens with Malik and the princess. The king is exultant to get his son back, and orders a 40-day feast to be held.

On the last night of festivities, a servant comes to tell Malik that his steed, Black Colt, has disappeared from the stables. Hurt by the news of his friend's departure, he goes to the stables and finds no trace of the horse, save for a mat with some of its black hairs on it. Malik squats down to pick them up and hears the steed's voice, as if in a dream, telling him they must separate, but, should the prince need his steed, he just has to burn the hairs, and Black Colt will come at once. Malik is grateful for this one last gift.

Analysis

Tale type
The tale is classified in the Aarne-Thompson-Uther Index as type ATU 314, "The Goldener": a youth with golden hair works as the king's gardener. The type may also open with the prince for some reason being the servant of an evil being, where he gains the same gifts, and the tale proceeds as in this variant.

Professor , in his catalogue of Persian folktales, named type 314 in Iranian sources as Das Zauberfohlen ("The Magic Horse"): the horse saves the protagonist from jealous relatives and takes him to another kingdom; in this kingdom, the protagonist is advised by the horse to dress in shabby garments (as a "Kačal") and work as the king's gardener; a princess falls in love with him. Marzolph listed 17 variants of this type across Persian sources. In addition, according to Marzolph, the tale type, also known as Korre-ye daryā’i (German: Das Meeresfohlen; English: "The Sea Foal"), is one of the most collected types in the archives of Markaz-e farhang-e mardom (Centre of Popular Culture).

Introductory episodes 
Scholarship notes three different opening episodes to the tale type: (1) the hero becomes a magician's servant and is forbidden to open a certain door, but he does and dips his hair in a pool of gold; (2) the hero is persecuted by his stepmother, but his loyal horse warns him and later they both flee; (3) the hero is given to the magician as payment for the magician's help with his parents' infertility problem. Folklorist Christine Goldberg, in Enzyklopädie des Märchens, related the second opening to former tale type AaTh 532, "The Helpful Horse (I Don't Know)", wherein the hero is persecuted by his stepmother and flees from home with his horse.

American folklorist Barre Toelken recognized the spread of the tale type across Northern, Eastern and Southern Europe, but identified three subtypes: one that appears in Europe (Subtype 1), wherein the protagonist becomes the servant to a magical person, finds the talking horse and discovers his benefactor's true evil nature, and acquires a golden colour on some part of his body; a second narrative (Subtype 3), found in Greece, Turkey, Caucasus, Uzbekistan and Northern India, where the protagonist is born through the use of a magical fruit; and a third one (Subtype 2). According to Toelken, this Subtype 2 is "the oldest", being found "in Southern Siberia, Iran, the Arabian countries, Mediterranean, Hungary and Poland". In this subtype, the hero (who may be a prince) and the foal are born at the same time and become friends, but their lives are at stake when the hero's mother asks for the horse's vital organ (or tries to kill the boy to hide her affair), which motivates their flight from their homeland to another kingdom.

Motifs
A motif that appears in tale type 314 is the hero having to find a cure for the ailing king, often the milk of a certain animal (e.g., a lioness). According to scholar , this motif occurs in tales from North Africa to East Asia, even among Persian- and Arabic-speaking peoples.

Professor Anna Birgitta Rooth stated that the motif of the stepmother's persecution of the hero appears in tale type 314 in variants from Slavonic, Eastern European and Near Eastern regions. She also connected this motif to part of the Cinderella cycle, in a variation involving a male hero and his cow.

The suitor selection test 
According to Turkologist , types ATU 314 and ATU 502 contain this motif: the princess chooses her own husband (of lowly appearance) in a gathering of potential suitors, by giving him an object (e.g., an apple). However, he also remarks that the motif is "spread in folk literature" and may appear in other tale types.

In regards to a similar tale from the Dungan people, according to Sinologist , the motif of a princess (or woman of high social standing) throwing a silken ball atop a high tower to choose her husband is reported in ancient Chinese literature, in the tale of "Lu Meng-Zheng": the princess throws a silken ball to a passing youth named Meng-Zheng (a poor student), and the king expels his daughter to live with her husband in a cave.

French folklorist Emmanuel Cosquin noted that the suitor selection test was component of a larger narrative: the princess or bride-to-be chooses the hero, in lowly disguise, by throwing him an apple. According to him, this motif would be comparable to the ancient Indian ritual of svayamvara, wherein the bride, in a public gathering, would choose a husband by giving him a garland of flowers.

The gardener hero 
Swedish scholar  drew attention to a possible ancient parallel to the gardener hero of the tale type: in an account of the story of king Sargon of Akkad, he, in his youth, works as a gardener in a palace and attracts the attention of goddess Ishtar. According to scholars Wolfram Eberhard and Pertev Naili Boratav, this would mean that the motif is "very old" ("sehr alt") in the Near East.

Variants
According to researcher Gunter Dammann, tale type 314 with the opening of hero and horse fleeing home extends from Western Himalaya and South Siberia, to Iran and the Arab-speaking countries in the Eastern Mediterranean. In addition, scholar Hasan El-Shamy stated that type 314 is "widely spread throughout north Africa", among Arabs and Berbers; in Sub-saharan Africa, as well as in Arabia and South Arabia.

Asia

Iran

The Colt Qéytās  
In a Persian tale collected by Emily Lorimer and David Lockhart Robertson Lorimer from Kermānī with the title The Story of the Colt Qéytās or Qéytās the Colt, a king's son is friends with a colt named Qéytās. His father remarries. One day, the colt cries to the boy and confesses that his stepmother plans to kill him: on her first attempt, she tries to poison the boy; on the second, she digs a well and places blades inside. After both attempts are thwarted, the stepmother convinces her husband to kill the horse. The boy and the colt escape to another kingdom. Now at a safe distance, Qéytās advises the boy to wear a sheepskin on his head and to seek employment with the king's gardener, and gives him one hair of its mane. The boy is hired as the king's gardener. One day, feeling lonely, he summons the horse to ride around the garden. The king's youngest daughter, a princess, from her window, sees the boy and falls in love with him. The princess goes to the gardens to question his identity, and the boy answers her that he is a "scald-headed". Some time later, the king's three daughters reach marriageable age (by comparing the ripeness of three melons) and take part in a husband selection contest by throwing oranges to their suitors. The elder princesses throw theirs to the Wizir's two sons, while the third princess throws hers to the gardener. Some time later, the king becomes ill and only the bird found in a distant desert can cure him. The boy, riding on Qéytās, gets the bird. Before he returns to the kingdom, he meets his brothers-in-law, who do not recognize him. He agrees to give hem the bird in exchange for them signing a pact to be the stranger's slaves, also suffer being branded on their backs. Marzolph classified this tale as his type 314.

The Black Foal 
In an Iranian tale published by orientalist Arthur Christensen with the title Das schwarze Füllen and translated as The Black Foal, a king has a 14-year-old son and remarries, but his new wife hates her step-son. The boy has a pet black foal, which the stepmother also detests, and plans to kill it to hurt the boy: she bribes the slave girls of the king's harem to say the queen need the meat of the black foal to be cured. The royal physicians concur with the slave girls and prescribe the meat of the foal. The king laments that he has to sacrifice the prince's pet horse, but wants to heal his wife, and decides his son is to be held at school for the entire day as to not see his pet's execution. Meanwhile, the foal cries to its owner and tells of his stepmother's plot to kill it, but plans with the prince to neigh three times to alert him. The next day, the prince is being held in school, when he hears the horse's neighing, and rushes back to the foal to save it. With tears, the prince pleads to his father   and tbe boy is to ask his father for one last ride on the horse. The king agrees to indulge his son, and, per his request, prepares a fine saddle filled with gems and money. The prince climbs onto the horse, cicles the courtyard two times and on the third time flies away on the horse to another kingdom. When they land, the foal gives some of its coat hairs to the prince which can be used to summon it, since it belongs to the family of the Peris, and departs. The prince enters the hut of a Kallepazi, buys a sheep's bladder to wear as a cap on his head, and finds work as apprentice to the sultan's gardener. One day, the prince fashions seven beautiful bouquets for the sultan's seven daughters, who notice the exquisite crafstmanship. Later, on one hot day, believing that no one is watching him, the prince goes to bathe in a rivulet behind the palace, leaves the water and summons his foal for a ride - an event witnessed by the youngest princess. Some time later, the princesses bring melons to their father as analogy for their marriageability, and the sultan prepares a suitor selection test: every men is to gather at a certain place, and the princesses are to throw an orange to their husbands of choice. The elder six princesses choose the vizier's son, an emir's son and sons of princes, while the youngest chooses the baldheaded gardener. Offended at her choice, the kings considers her dead to him, but the princess cannot be happier with her husband, and they move out to a small house on the outskirts of the town. Some time later, the king falls ill, and only broth made with gazelle meat can cure him. The prince summons his black foal to hunt some gazelles, and reaches the forest before his brothers-in-law. He asks the foal to command the Peris to make preparations for a royal hunt and to draw the animals to him, and so it happens. The brothers-in-law ride into the forest, and find the prince in royal garbs, unaware he is the lowly gardener. Seeing that the man has the gazelles all around him, they ask him to share some. The prince agrees to a deal: the meat in exchange for branding a slave mark on their backs. The prince gives them the carcasses and keeps the heads for himself. He returns home and gives the gazelle heads for his wife to prepare a broth for the sultan. He health improves after he eats the youngest's dish. At the end of the tale, the prince doff the lowly gardener disguise and sets up his tents outside the sultan's kingdom. The sultan's scouts report that the prince is looking for his six slaves. The prince is welcomed by the sultan with a grand reception, and points to the sultan's sons-in-law as his slaves. Then, the seventh princess comes out of a curtain and reveals the prince is her husband, the gardener. The sultan, at last, recognizes the prince as his successor and crowns him.

The Wonderful Sea-Horse (Elwell-Sutton) 
In a Persian tale collected by author Mashdi Galeen Khanom and translated by scholar Laurence Paul Elwell-Sutton with the title The Wonderful Sea-Horse, prince Ebrahim is given a magical sea-horse from his father, the king, and feeds it with sweets. When the boy is 13 years old, the princesses, his sisters, begin to hate him, since their father dotes on the boy, and decide to kill him: first, they hire well-diggers to dig up a hole in his room, place blades and knives inside it, and cover it with carpets; next, they bribe the cook to poison their brother's food. However, Ebrahim is warned of the danger by his sea-horse, and avoids the traps. After both attempts, Ebrahim shows his father the proof of the crime, and the king traces the order to his own daughters, but they remain silent. The princesses notice that their plans failed and investigate into the matter: the sea-horse is helping their brother, so they feign illness and ask for the sea-horse's meat as cure. The sea-horse warns Ebrahim and they plot a escape from the kingdom: around the time of the sea-horse's execution, Ebrahim is to ask for a last ride on the animal, and they must seize the opportunity to flee. Prince Ebrahim escapes to another kingdom where he finds work as the royal gardener's assistant. One day, he sees his employer preparing bouquets for the king's three daughters, and asks if he can arrange some and bring to the princesses. Ebrahim takes the flowers and goes to the terrace where the princesses are, and gives his bouquet to the youngest, named Pari, to her sisters' envy.

Sea Horse (Sobhi) 
In a Persian tale collected by author Fazl'ollah Mohtadi Sobhi and translated into Russian by Anna Rozenfel'd with the title "Морской конёк" ("Sea Horse"), young prince Jamshid loses his mother. On words of a wise man, his father, the padishah, decides to give him a wonderful gift: a horse from the sea, which shall become the boy's best friend. On his orders, his knights capture a horse just as it comes out of the sea. The sea horse is given to Jamshid, and both become great friends. In time, the padishah remarries, and Jamshid grows up; his wife, the prince's step-mother, begins to notice her step-son in a sexual light and tries to seduce him, but he refuses her advances. Out of spite, she conspires with a slave to kill the prince: first, they dig up a hole, fill it with blades and spears, and cover it; next, they try to poison his food. On both occasions, the sea horse warns Jamshid about the danger. The step-mother discovers the horse's help and plots to have it killed: she feigns illness and asks for its heart and liver. Jamshid returns from school one day, and is told of the horse's upcoming execution, so he and the animal devise a plan: the horse will neigh three times, and Jamshid shall meet him before the butcher's strike. The next day, it happens as they planned; Jamshid asks his father to ride the sea horse around the estate one last time. The prince circles the garden six or seven times, then jumps over the garden walls into the unknown and away from his home kingdom. At a distance, the sea horse gives some of its hair to Jamshid, which he can use to summon it, and they part ways. Jamshid goes to another city, where he finds work as assistant to the king's gardener. The king has three daughters, the youngest the most beautiful of the three. The gardener and Jamshid prepare bouquets for the princesses, who notice their delicate craftsmanship. Ten days after parting ways, Jamshid summons the sea horse for a ride around the royal garden - an event witnessed by the youngest princess. Some time later, the three princesses bring melons to their father, the king, as analogy of their marriageability, and the king sets a suitor selection test: the princesses are to throw oranges at their husbands of choice. The elder princess chooses the son of the vizier of the right hand, the middle one the son of the vizier of the left hand, and the princess chooses the gardener's assistant. Much to his disgust, the king expels the youngest princess to a humble life out of the palace, and, after seven days, begins to miss her terribly, so much so he falls ill. The royal doctors then prescribe heads and legs of a gazelle in a dish prepares by the princess, and the three sons-in-law must hunt it down. Prince Jamshid rides ahead of them, summons the sea horse and prepares a large tent for him. He meets his brothers-in-law, who ask him for a piece of gazelle meat. Prince Jamshid agrees to share some of them, as long as he can brand his shoulders with his royal seal. Later, after the king eats the gazelle meat, Jamshid summon the sea horse again and asks for a palace more gradiose than his father-in-law's. He approaches the king and demands his two slaves, and, as proof of his claims, points to his two brothers-in-law. The king then sees his daughter next to Jamshid, and is given an explanation of the ruse. At the end of the tale, Jamshid returns home to cure his father (who has become blind after his son left home), ousts his step-mother, and gets to rule both kingdoms after his father and father-in-law die.

Foal (Osmanov) 
Professor  published an Iranian tale titled "Жеребенок" ("Foal"). In this tale, a man and a wife have a son. When he is 8 or 9 years old, the father sends him to school. Around the same time, his wife dies and he marries another woman. The new step-mother dislikes her step-son, and conspires with a witch ways to kill him. Her first attempt is to poison a bowl of food and serve him. The boy's pet horse warns him of the threat and he avoids eating the food. She repeats the poison plot with a cake, which he also avoids. The next attempt is for her to dig up a hole and cover it with a carpet, so that he falls in it. This plan is also foiled. Tired of her defeats, she consults with the witch again and she suggests someone in the house has been protecting the boy. The step-mother deduces it is the horse, and concocts a plan to get rid of him: she conspires with a doctor to feign illness and to ask for horse meat as the only cure for her. Her husband agrees to sacrifice his son's horse to get its meat for her, but the horse and the boy also have a plan of their own. As the horse is taken to the garden to be put down, it whinnies three times to draw the boy's attention to go out of school. The boy hears the whinny, tosses some dust on the mullah's face to distract him, and hurries back home to save his horse. He rides the animal and leaps over the assembled crowd and rushes far away from home. He meets a humble shepherd and buys from him a goat's stomach to place it in his head. He finds work as the king's gardener. Some time into his job, he summons his horse to ride alone in the garden. The princess sees him from her window and falls in love with the mysterious rider. She deduces the rider is the gardener. In the suitor selection ceremony, the princess and her elder sisters choose their respective husbands by throwing oranges to the noblemen. The youngest princess, however, tosses hers to the gardener. The king escorts her and his lowly son-in-law to the stables. Later, the king falls ill, and only deer meat can cure him. The gardener departs to get some venison, and finds his brothers-in-law in the same mission. Wearing rich garments, he introduces himself to the princes and offers them the venison, in exchanging for branding their backs.

The Merhorse 
In a variant from Luristan with the title The Merhorse (Luri language: Bahnî (Xudâwas)), collected from teller Khudâbas of Bahârvand, a king has a son who owns a foal he found in the sea. One day, the king remarries, and the new queen tries to seduce her step-son. He refuses her advances, and she conspires against him: first, she tries to poison her step-son's food twice, but the prince's friend, the merhorse, warns him against eating the food; next, she feigns sickness and asks for the meat of the prince's merhorse. The prince learns of this and plots with the horse: on the day of the animal's execution, the boy is to be allowed a last ride on it, and must take the opportunity to flee. It happens according to their plan and they reach another kingdom. The horse gives the prince some of its hairs and advises the boy to find work in the city. The prince disguises himself as a poor beggar and finds shelter with an poor old woman. The king of this city has seven daughters, and arranges a suitor selection test: the princesses are to release hawks at random, and they shall marry whoever the birds land next to. The prince, in his beggar disguise, goes to the ceremony, and the youngest princess's hawk lands near him. The king marries his seventh daughter to the beggar, much to his disgust, and expels her to a shabby hut. Later, the king becomes blind, and only some meat can cure him. The king's sons-in-laws go on a hunt, while the prince rides behind them. At a distance, he takes off the lousy disguise, puts on regal clothes and builds a tent, where he rests after getting more game than his brothers-in-law. He meets the king's other sons-in-law and agrees to share his game, in exchange for branding their rumps. Later, the kingdom goes to war, and the prince summons the merhorse, which he rides into battle to win the war in his father-in-law's favour. In his noble clothes, the prince then goes to meet the king and demands his six slaves, which are the other sons-in-law with marks on their bodies.

Other tales 
In an untitled tale collected by Turkologist Gerhard Doerfer and professor Semih Tezcan in the Khalaj language (a Turkic language from Iran), a man named Xāja Turāb has three sons, Sa'īd, Māhān and Hāmān. Sa'īd's mother dies when he is still a child, and is cared for a stepmother. Their father sends his sons to school, where they learn swordfighting and horse riding, and Sa'id excels at both. Driven by envy, the stepmother bakes bread for the youths and laces Sa'id's with poison. Sa'id's horse, of the race of "Dämonenpferde" ("demon horses"), can change its shape and talk, and warns its master of the stepmother's trick. One of Sa'id's brothers eats the cake destined for Sa'id and dies. Eventually, the stepmother convinces her husband to kill the horse, but Sa'id, who has plotted with the horse, asks his father for his some money, his rifle and sword, and for a last ride on the animal. Xāja Turāb agrees to indulge his son, and Sa'íd mounts on the horse. After circling the patio three times, Sa'id rides the horse and both jump over the walls to any other place. At a safe distance, the horse gives Sa'id some hairs of its mane for the youth to burn in case he needs it, and vanishes. Sa'id goes to a nearby city, buys from a shepherd his clothes and fashions a cap out of a sheep's stomach, then finds work as assistant to a bath heater from a public bathhouse. Some time later, the local king sets a suitor selection test: every available man shall come to the public square, and his daughters shall release falcons at random; whomever the birds land on, the princesses shall marry them. The eldest girl's falcon perches on the son of the vizier of the right hand; the middle daughter's lands on the son of the vizier of the left hand; and the youngest's lands on Sa'id. Thinking her daughter's falcon made a mistake, the king orders her to release it again and again; it still perches on Sa'id. Feeling humiliated, the king marries his elder two daughters in lavish ceremonies, and banishes his youngest daughter from his sight. Some time later, the king falls ill, and only gazelle meat can cure him. Sa'īd decides to join in the quest along with his brothers-in-law, but first explains to his wife, the youngest princess, that he is no mere assistant to a bath heater. He is then given a lame horse and a rusty sword, but, out of sight, summons his loyal horse and rides before his brothers-in-law. Stopping at a point in the steppe, Sa'id asks his horse to summon every animal of the steppe; gazelles, panthers, lions and every sort of animal come to him. Soon after, the two brothers-in-law reach hi, and, seeing the animals next to the youth, ask for some gazelle carcasses. Sa'id, whom they don't recognize, agrees to share some of his game, in exchange for them allowing to be branded on their backs. The tale was indexed as type *314 of Marzolph's Catalogue of Persian Folktales.

In a tale from the Vafsi language translated as The young man disguises himself and gets the princess, a man has a son he dotes on. When his wife dies, he remarries, but his new wife has a row with her stepson, who beats her two or three times. In retaliation, the stepmother plans to poison her stepson, but the boy gets word of this and flees home with his magic horse to another kingdom. In this kingdom, he wears a sheep's rumen on his head - so he looks like a bald man -, dresses in shabby clothes and wanders through the city. Meanwhile, the kingdom's three princesses are still unmarried and bring melons to their father as analogy for their marriageability. The king then orders his vizier to summon the people to the square, where his daughters are to release falcons at random, and whomever the birds land on, they shall marry. The people gather in the square, and the princesses release their falcons: the eldest's lands on the vizier's son, the middle one's on the deputy's son, and the youngest's on the bald man. Some time later, the king goes blind, and sends his three sons-in-law to get him some meat. Two sons-in-law ride in magnificent horses, while the bald man is given a weaker horse. When he is out of sight, the bald man takes off the shabby disguise, burns a hair from his horse and summons him, and both ride to the valley to hunt some deer. A while later, his brothers-in-law come along and, not recognizing him, ask for some of the deer. The youth agrees to give them the carcasses and keep the deer heads, in exchanging for them allowing to be branded in their thighs. After they seal the transaction and leave, the youth dimisses his magic horse, puts on the sheep's rumen and shabby clothes to become one again a bald man, and rides back to his poor hut. As for the king, he tastes dishes prepared with the deer meat, but his sight does not improve. The bald man then suggests his wife, the youngest princess, invites her father for deer head soup. With nothing to lose, the king accepts the invitation and goes to his daughter's poor hut for a meagre dinner, but he eats the soup and his health improves. Now that his opinion of his son-in-law improves, the king suggests the bald man to find a location to build a better house for himself and his wife. After the king goes back to his castle, the bald man, who has a magic ring of Solomon, commands it to provide him with a palace larger than the king's; he then summons his magic horse, which brings him his fine clothes. After the palace if built, the youth sends footmen to invite the king for a feast. The king, his father-in-law, goes to the palace with his vizier and his sons-in-law and dines with the stranger. The stranger, who the king does not recognize as his youngest daughter's husband, tells the guests he is after his two slaves, and indicates his brothers-in-law as such, teling them about their branded thighs.

South Asia 
Anglo-British academic Lucas White King collected a tale during his stay in Dera Ghazi Khan District and published it as a Punjabi tale. In this story, titled The Prince and the Spirit Horse, a sultan remarries. His second wife tries to seduce her step-son, but he rejects her advances. Feeling dejected, she feigns illness and asks for the prince's horse as a cure. The story then flashbacks to the time when the prince got his horse: the sultan had a mare in the stables that foaled next to a well; the prince followed her and asked for a foal to be given to him. Back to the present, the sultan decides to sacrifice it to appease his new wife, but the prince asks for one last ride on the horse. He seizes the opportunity to gallop away from his father's kingdom and reach a distant city, where he passes by the king's balcony and the youngest princess falls in love with him at first sight. Later, the prince dismisses the horse and finds work as a cowherd. The city's king learns of his youngest's infatutation with the cowherd, marries her to him and gives her a poor house fit for a cowherd's living. Later, the prince joins his six brothers-in-law for a hunt: while the other men have no luck in getting good game, the prince summons his horse, dons fine garments and hunts much sport. The six brothers-in-law meet the prince, but do not recognize him, and ask for a share of his game; the prince agrees to give them some, in exchange for him branding their backs. Next, a neighbouring sultan prepares to invade the city, and the king's seven sons-in-law are summoned to fight him. The prince takes off the cowherd disguise, summons his horse and joins the fray to turn the tide of battle in favour of his father-in-law. The battle over, he returns to his lowly position, while the other six princes take the credit for the victory. The cowherd's wife, the seventh princess, visits her sisters and they boast about their husbands' prowess in battle. The princess cries to her husband, who decides to reveal himself to his father-in-law. To prove his claims, the prince tells about the branded backs of the other princes.

In a Balochi tale collected by Iranist Ivan Zarubin and published with the title "О кознях мачехи и приключениях царевича" ("About the stepmother's intrigue and the boy's adventures"), a king has three sons, two by a first wife, and a third by a second (deceased) wife. One day, the king gives fine horses to the elder two and an old one to the youngest. The youngest's horse goes to foal near the water and someone pulls its legs from inside the water, while the third prince pull from the other side. The person ceases their action, and recommens the prince feeds the foal with black sheep's milk. Later, the king's first wife plans to kill her step-son: first by giving him poisoned bread, then digs up a hole and covers with a carpet. With the foal's help, the prince avoids both dangers. Lastly, she feigns illness and asks for meat of a water horse. The foal warns the prince and both hatch a plan: the horse will whinny eight times to alert him; he is to come and ask for a last ride on it, then they must make their escape. The next day, the king plans the horse's execution, and everything happens according to their plan: the prince flies away with the horse, and leaves a letter telling the king of the step-mother's plan. During the journey, the prince helps a female div and gains some of her hairs to summon her and her family in the hour of need. Next, the prince kills a snake to protect a nest of Simurgh chicks, and gains some feathers. Finally, he buys some sheep skin to use as a cap, and finds work under the royal gardener. The next day, while the princesses are away bathing, the prince summons his loyal foal and rides around the garden. He rests to comb his hair with a golden comb, and notices the princesses are returning, he barely has time to hide the comb and dismiss the horse, and the youngest princess takes notice of this. Some days later, the princesses send melons to their father as analogy for their marriagebility, and the king sends for every available suitor to a selection: the princesses are to release pigeons at random; whoever the birds land on, they shall marry. The youngest's pigeon lands on the gardener's apprentice. She repeats the action twice more, which confirms her choice of a husband. The king marries his three daughters and places the elder two in good palaces, while the young goes to live with the gardener in a donkey stable. Later, the king sends his sons-in-law to hunt some gazelles as game. The boy summons the horse and gathers all gazelles in the forest to his tent. His brothers-in-law come to meet him, whom they don't recognize, and, seeing the animals around him, ask for a piece. The prince agrees, as long as they allow to be branded with slave marks on their feet. Next, war erupts, and the king leads the army to war. The prince rides his loyal horse and, with the help of the divs and the Simurgh, defeats the enemies. When he is hurt, the king bandages his injuries with a handkerchief, then returns to the donkey stables. The war over, the princess recognizes her father's handkerchief on the gardener's hand, then goes to tell her father. The next morning, the prince awakes, summons the horse and orders a large golden palace to be built in front of his father-in-law's. The prince shows up in his true form and reveals the slave marks on his brothers-in-law, thus confirming his story. The king then makes him his successor.

Central Asia

Turkmenistan
In a Turkmen tale translated as "Шахзаде и ею жеребенок" ("Shahzade and his Foal"), a padishah has two wives and a son by the first one. One day, his first wife dies, and the padishah sends his son to herd the horses by the beach. Suddenly, a horse comes out the sea and mates with one of the mares. Months later, a foal is born to the mare. The padishah gets his son out of the horse herd task and places him with a mullah to learn. His father also wants to gift him with one of the horses, and he chooses the foal that the sea horse sired. Years later, the padishah's second wife gives birth to a son, and he celebrates with a seven-day feast. The boy, named Shahzade, goes to the mullah and returns to groom his horse. He notices the horse is crying, and asks it the reason. The horse answers that the boy's step-mother plans to kill him with poisoned food. Heeding his warning, he does not eat the food. In another occasion, the step-mother digs up a hole in their yurt, fills it with spears and covers it. The horse warns him again and he avoid the pitfall, only for his half-brother to fall into the trap. The third time, the step-mother pretends to be ill and says her only cure is the heart of a black-tongued horse. The padishah orders the horse's sacrifice. The day before, the horse conspires with the boy that it will whinny three times to call his attention, and he should tell his father he wants a last ride on the horse. The next day, it happens as the horse planned, Shahzade rides the animal to another city and establishes himself there, as the tale ends.

Tajikistan 
In a Tajik tale titled "Музаффар и его конь" ("Muzaffar and his Horse"), a padishah has no son, until his wife gives birth to one and dies. In his grief, he lets his son, named Muzaffar, be raised in a underground house, under the tutelage of nurses and mentors, until he is fifteen years old. One day, Muzaffar's mentor allows him to leave the underground house into the outside world, and is appointed his father's hair. Some time later, he goes to the market and buys a lame looking horse. Meanwhile, the padishah has remarried, and his new wife hates her step-son so much she plans to kill him: she digs up a hole, places diamond spikes in it for him to fall into, and covers it with a carpet. The horse warns Muzaffar against his step-mother's attempt. Later, the woman overhears a conversation between the boy and the animal and hatches a plan: she feigns illness and asks for the horse's meat as cure. The horse is aware of the evil plot and plans with the boy: the horse will whinny three times to call the boy's attention, then he is to ask his father for a last ride around the city on the animal. The plan goes without a hitch, and both flee from the city. Reaching a distant mountain, the horse gives Muzaffar some of is hairs and they part ways. The boy finds work as a shepherd, then sails to another kingdom, named Korf, where he works as the padishah's gardener. This second padishah has three daughters: Gulsun, Fatima Dunyo and Malika Dunyo. One day, Muzaffar arranges a beaufitul bouquet for the youngest princess, who begins to reciprocate his feelings. Some time later, the three princesses bring melons to their father as analogy for the marriageability, and the padishah organizes a suitor selection test: the princesses are to wait by a balcony and throw apples to their husbands of choice. The elder, Gulsun, throws hers to the son of the wazir; Fatima Dunyo, the middle one, casts her to the son of a magistrate, and Malika Dunyo to the lowly gardener. The padishah congratulates his elder daughters and gifts them houses and herds, and gives a meagre oil mill to the youngest. Some time later, Muzaffar joins his sons-in-law for a hunt: he doffs his menial disguise, summons his loyal horse and climbs up a mountain, where he meets an old man, who goads him into hunting fallow deer. Muzaffar kills some game, and discovers their meat is bitter, but the entrails are quite tasty. Suddenly, his brothers-in-law appear near the foot of the mountain, and he signals them to go up and meet him. The brothers-in-law do not recognize Muzaffar, but are given the bitter deer meat and leave the mountain to return to the padishah to prepare his food. Muzaffar also returns and prepares a soup with the entrails, which the padishah eats with gusto. Later, the padishah of the nearby city of Toroj threatens to invade Korf as revenge for being rebuffed by Malika Dunyo, and the princesses' husbands join in the fight for the kingdom. Muzaffar rides the horse in his golden garments and defeats the enemy army, but is hurt in the right hand. His father-in-law bandages Muzaffar's hand, and he flees the battlefield back to his wife. At the end of the tale, to celebrate his victory, the padishah of Korf holds a grand banquet and invites the entire realm. Muzaffar and his wife go to the feast in fine garments, and the padishah recognizes his handkerchief on him.

Uzbekistan 
Isidor Levin and Ilse Laude-Cirtautas translated and published an Uzbek tale titled Erka-Dschản (Uzbek: Erkažon). In this tale, Erka-Dschản is the son of a padishah, and is given a foal. When he is fifteen years old, his mother dies and his father remarries. The boy's stepmother has two sons of a previous marriage and despises Erka-Dschản, to the point of tormenting the boy and even trying to poison his bread, but the boy's foal warns him. The stepmother sees an interaction between the boy and the animal and bides her time. After the padishah dies, the foal tells Erka-Dschản about his stepmother's plan: she will ask for its meat to cure her false ailment; the horse will neigh three times to alert him, and the boy is to ask for one last ride on the animal. The next day, it happens as the foal described: Erka-Dschản stops the execution in time and begs for one last ride on his foal, then seizes the opportunity to flee from his kingdom. At a distance, the foal gives Erka-Dschản some of its hairs to help him, and leaves, while the boy goes to look for work in  a nearby kingdom. He claims to be a poor, lonely youth and the royal gardener takes him in as his assistant. Some time later, the royal gardener prepares flowers for the three princesses, and Erka-Dschản places some beautiful bouquets for them. Later, the girls take melons from the orchard and take it to their father, as analogy of their marriageability. Thus, the padishah of this kingdom orders a suitor selection test: every men are to stay beneath the royal pavillion, from where the princesses will throw apples to their husbands of choice. The two elder princesses throw theirs to noble men, and the youngest to Erka-Dschản, who just happened to be passing by. The padishah celebrates grand weddings for his two elder daughters, and talks to the third one about moving away from the palace with her husband. Time passes; the padishah wants to put his three sons-in-law to the test, and orders them to hunt for swans. Later, war breaks out, and Erka-Dschản joins in the fight with his brothers-in-law, riding a lame mule at first, but, when he is out of sight, he summons his loyal horse again and fights for his father-in-law's kingdom.

Dungan people 
In a tale from the Dungan people titled "Чжон Тянью" ("Zhong Tianyu"), a yuanwei named Zhong has a golden-haired boy named Zhong Tianyu. After his mother dies, Zhong marries another woman. Zhong Tianyu has a special black foal with white hooves and a full moon on its forehead. One day, the boy finds his stepmother in bed with a lama, and tells his father, who does not believe him. Fearing her step-son will reveal the affair, she tries to kill him, first by giving him a coat that will burn him if he puts it on, and later by preparing chicken that willa also burn him if he eats it. With the horse's warnings, the boy avoids both dangers. Failing twice, the stepmother realizes the foal helped him and, advised by her lover, the lama, feigns illness and asks for the horse's heart as cure. Anticipating the woman's ploy, the foal plans with the boy: it will whinny three times to alert him when he is still at school; he is to return at once and ask for a last ride on the foal. The next day, it happens as the horse predicted: Zhong Tianyu circles the estate three times, then flies into the air and escapes from the kingdom. At a distance, the horse advises the boy to shirk its royal garments and weapons, pretend he is a lowly servant and find work; it also gives the boy some of its hairs, and vanishes. Zhong Tianyu finds an old couple's house and asks for shelter. The couple take him in; the old man notices the boy's golden hair and warns him to hide it beneath a cap of sheepskin. One day, the boy goes to bathe in a neaby pond, where the local three princesses are taking a stroll; the youngest notices the golden-haired youth. Later, Zhong Tianyu works as the gardener's assistant, and cuts three watermelons for the gardener to bring to the emperor. The emperor then orders the old man to explain their meaning the next day. Zhong Tianyu goes in his adoptive father's behalf and tells the empror the fruits represent his daughters' marriageability: the elder overripe, the middle one ripe, and the youngest just right. So, the emperor prepares a suitor selection test: every available man in the kingdom shall pass by the palace, and the princesses are to throw a sewn ball to their husbands of choice. The elder princess throws hers to an army commander, the middle one to a high official, and the youngest to the gardener's assistant. The emperor marries his two daughters and present them with lavish gifts, while the youngest moves out of the palace to a hut near the stables. Some time later, the emperor sends his two sons-in-law to hunt him some game; Zhong Tianyu secrerly joins the hunt, summons his loyal horse and rides to a place where he can find the most game. His two brothers-in-law appear soon after and, seeing the youth with the best game, ask for some; Zhong Tianyu agrees to share, so long as they agree to be branded on their backs. One month later, war breaks out against a human king, and the emperor's sons-in-law ride into battle. Zhong Tianyu summons the horse and defeats the enemy army, but lets his brothers-in-law take the credit, if they let him cut off a slice of their horses backs. During a second fight, his hand is injured, and the third princess bandages it. Next, in a confrontation against a multiheaded creature, he kills it, and goes to the emperor's palace on the black foal to reveal his ruse. His brothers-in-law come after him and boast about their victory, but Zhong Tianyu shows the emperor the branded backs and their horses' cut off flesh. The emperor orders their execution and nominates Zhong Tianyu as his heir. At the end of the tale, he returns home to avenge his father and kill his stepmother and the lama. He brings his father to his wife's kingdom and cures him with a magical herb and a magical water.

Europe

Western Europe

France 
In a German language tale collected by folklorist  with the title Der edel-weise Ritter ("The Noble-Wise Knight"), the titular noble-wise knight loses his father, a count, during a war, and has to find work as squire to another lord, taking his Schimmel ("gray-white") horse with him. Some time into his work, his master, a Jew, conspires with his wife get rid of the squire: they give him a coat laced with poison. The horse advises the squire to commission a similar coat from a tailor to avoid the danger. Failing that, the Jew plans to kill him directly with a dagger. Before the fateful hour, the horse advises the squire to ask for a last favour: to be able to ride the Schimmel horse one last time. The next day, the squire is told he is to be killed, but repeats the horse's words to his master. The master grants his wish and the squire seizes the opportunity to ride away from the castle and into the castle of the Jew's enemy. The horse advises the squire to wear a cap on his head and find work as a gardener under the identity of a Grindkopf, while the animal stays near a hollow oak outside the castle. The squire becomes the king's gardener and, one day, takes off his cap to wash himself and exposes his golden hair - an event witnessed by the king's daughter. The princess then begins to take an interest in the gardener, to her parents' annoyance. Some time later, war breaks out, and the gardener rides a lame fox to battle, but, out of sight, trades the fox for his Schimmel horse and defeats the enemy army, then goes back to the gardener's hut. This happens twice more. On the third battle, however, the Jew stabs the noble-wise knight in the leg with a bayonetta. The knight takes out the bayonetta shrapnel and bandages his wound, then defeats the enemy army for the third time, and rides back to his hut. the king organizes a feast and invites the Jew as a peace offering. The gardener goes to the feast as the noble-wise knight and shows his leg wound as proof of his deed. Then, one of the guests suggests they tell their life stories, and the noble-wise knight narrates how the Jew tried to kill him. Upon hearing the tale, the Jew flees from the feast, and the noble-wise knight marries the princess.

Germany 
In a German tale from Silesia with the title Der treue Hansel ("The faithful Hansel"), a farmer has an apple tree in his garden. In spring, the tree yields an apple. The farmer brings it home to share it with his wife, but he hears a commotion in the stables and goes to check on it: the horses are loose. He locks them again and goes back home, only to discover that his half of the apple was eaten by a mare, while the other by his wife. Some time later, a boy is born to them, named Johann, and a foal to the mare. Johann takes care of the foal after he comes back from school, to the chagrin of a witch neighbour. The witch tricks Johann's mother to kill the boy: first, by giving him cake laced with poison; next, by giving him cake with an even larger dose of poison. The horse, however, advises the boy to avoid eating it. Failing that, the witch convinces the farmer to kill the horse. The next day, Johann asks his father to ride one last time on the horse around his house. The boy rides around the patio three times, then gallops away to the forest. In the forest, Johann washes his hair in a pond and it becomes golden, then uys a pig's bladder to wear as a cap. He finds work as a gardener's assistant in a prince (Fürst)'s castle, but in a probationary status: Johann has to dig up holes and plant new trees to get the position. Johann's horse, Hansel, tells him to sleep while he takes care of everything. Somehow, the horse fulfills Johann's tasks, to the gardener's appreciation. Later, Johann prepares a nice bouquet of flowers to the prince's youngest daughter, and finishes it with a strand of his golden hair as a bow. The princess appreciates the gift and, one night, sees Johann's golden hair and notices a similar strand on the bouquet. Later, the princesses are eligible to be married, and the Fürst sets a suitor selection test for them: for each day, each princess are to throw a golden ring to an assemblage of knights, and whoever catches hers shall marry her. During the selection, Johann rides his horse Hansel and catches the rings. Some time later, the youngest princess decides to marry Johann, the gardener, much to her father's consternation, and is expelled from the palace to live in a shabby inn, but she cannot be happier. Johann renovates the inn with the golden coins he earned from his job, and lives with the princess. Later, war breaks out, and the Fürst's sons-in-law ride into battle to defend the realm. Johann is given a lame mule and a rusty sword, but, out of sight, summons Hansel and goes to defend his father-in-law. Johann fights in three campaigns and is injured in the foot in the third, which the Fürst dresses with a scarf. Johann rides back to the inn and rests from the battle. The Fürst organizes a banquet for the kingdom and invites everyone, but Johann does not go due to his injury. The Fürst comes to the inn and notices his scarf on the gardener's foot, proving he was the knight at the battlefield. The Fürst then names Johann his successor. Later, his horse Hansel asks Johann to cut off its head. Despite his pleas not to ask such a thing, Johann does as the horse asked: the horse then turns into a human, the spitting image of Johann, and lives in happiness with his brother and his sister-in-law.

Germanist  collected a German language tale with the title Das treue Füllchen. In the first part of the tale, a shepherd named Hans finds three horses, one of a grey colour, the second of a black colour, and the third of a bay colour, which he uses to climb up a glass mountain three times and gain a princess for wife. He marries the princess and, one year later, she gives birth to a son, but Hans, now a prince, is summons to fight a war in another country. Meanwhile, a white horse foals a colt in the stables, which becomes the prince's friend and they grow up together. However, while Hans is away, the princess has an affair with a Jew from their court, for six years. At the end of this period, the princess gets news that Hans is coming back home, and her lover and she fear that the young boy will divulge their affair, so they plot to kill him: first, they try to give him coffee laced with poison; next, they give him a smock that will kill him. With the colt's warnings, the boy avoid both dangers: he gives the cat the coffee and puts the smock on the dog; both animals die. Hans finally returns home and his wife, the princess, feigns illness and asks for their son's tongue bathed in milk as her cure. Hans ponders on this dilemma, but, upon seeing his son's animal companion, decides to kill the horse and take its tongue to spare the boy. The horse warns Hans's son that the boy's father will kill him, but they can avoid this fate: the boy is to ask his father to ride the colt around the castle three times, and they will seize the opportunity to flee. It happens thus: the boy rides the horse to another kingdom, where the boy finds work as a horse groomer and is given a magic chain to summon his equine friend. The boy excels at horse grooming, but, one day, he sees the royal gardener arranging bouquets for the princess, and wants to have a go at it. The boy's floral arrangement impresses the gardener, who wishes to take him as his apprentice. The boy works in the garden and, on Saturdays, when he finishes his chores, he summons his loyal colt and rides around the garden - events witnessed by the princess, who falls deeply in love with him. Some time later, the princess tells the king she wants to marry the gardener's assistant, but the king gives her three days to think over her decision, otherwise he will place her in the Hinkelhaus as soon as she is married. The princess is dead set on her decision and moves out with her husband to the Hinkelhaus, and suffers mockery from the court, but her husband comforts her. Soon after, war breaks out, and the garderner's assistant is given a lame mount and a wooden sword, but, as soon as he is out of sight, he summons his horse and ides into battle. He guides the soldiers to victory, but is injured in his leg. His father-in-law, the king, sees the injury and bandages it with his royal handkerchief. The knights rides back to the lame mount and dismisses his horse. Back to the Hinkelhaus, the princess notices her husband's wound and her father's handkerchief. She then takes it and goes to talk to her father, the king, who is searching the whole kingdom for the mysterious knight at the battlefield. The gardener's assistant wake up, summons his horse again, and rides to court to take his wife and gallop away to another land.

Southern Europe

Greece 
Austrian consul Johann Georg von Hahn collected a Greek tale from Epirus with the title Vom Prinzen und seinem Fohlen, which author and folklorist Lucy Garnett translated as The Prince and the Foal. In this tale, a king has no son, so a Jew comes and gives him an apple for the queen. The queen eats the apple, becomes pregnant and gives birth to a boy. A mare also eats it and foals. The foal and the prince become great friends and ride together. While the king is away at war, the Jew seduces the queen and convinces her to poison her son, so he cannot stand in their way. One day, after the boy comes home from school, he sees his foal crying in the stables. The foal reveals the queen, his mother, poisoned his food, so he should not eat it. After the first attempt is foiled, the queen tries to kill him by poisoning his wine and placing poisoned needles on his bed, but the horse warns the prince on both occasions. After the king returns, the queen - once again, convinced by the Jew - feigns illness and the Jew tells the king that, by killing the prince, the queen can be cured. The horse learns of this and tells the prince. The boy, then, asks his father to give him three suits, one with the stars and its skies, the second with the springtime and its flowers, and the third with the sea and its waves, and allow him to ride around the palace three times with the suits, before he is killed. The king indulges his son one last time and gives him the suits, but the prince, cunningly, rides around the palace three times and rides away on the horse to another regions. At a safe distance, he wears a smock and a raggedy cap over his suit, takes some hairs from the horse and tells the animal to come whenever he burns them, and dimisses it. The prince finds work in a city as a king's gardener. One day, while everyone is asleep, the prince rides the horse around the garden in secret, but he is spied on by the king's youngest daughter. Some time later, the king tells his three daughters to take a melon in the garden; the princess do and explain the melons as analogy for their marriagebility (one overripe, another a bit overripe, the last ripe enough), so the king summons all available men in the kingdom for a suitor selection test: the princesses are to throw golden apples at their desired husbands. The youngest princess throws hers to the gardener. Despite the king's protests, the third princess marries the gardener and is expelled from the palace to live with the poor youth. Time passes, and the king falls ill. The royal doctors order the water of life ("deathless water", in Garnett's translation) as his only remedy. The king's two sons-in-law ride away in gallant horses, while the gardener rides in a lame mule. At a hiding spot, the gardener summons his faithful horse and gallops to the fountain of water of life to fetch some in a flask. He waits for hie brothers-in-law and says he can give some of the water to them, provided they allow his horse to strike their bodies. The brothers-in-law consent and returns to the king. The gardener returns home and gives his wife the flask to take to her father. The king is healed and embraces the gardener as his son-in-law, but the youth orders the king to pave a golden path between the castle and the gardener's hut. The king obeys, and the gardener doffs the raggedy clothes, and rides to the castle in the suit of armor with the sea with its waves. The prince then orders his brothers-in-law to show the horseshoe prints on their bodies.

Italy 
In a Sicilian variant collected in Buccheri by folklorist Giuseppe Pitre with the title Filippeddu, a widowed king marries a new wife. The new queen gives birth to a son, and she plots to have her step-son killed to make way for her own child. Meanwhile, the prince buys a little horse in the fair and brings it to the stables. Back to the queen, she conspires with her doctor to feign illness and declare that the only cure is the prince's blood. One day, when the prince is back from school, he goes to the stables to see his horse friend, and finds the animal crying. The horse answers that the prince will die, but plans an escape: saddle the horse and ask his father to have a go around the garden for two hours, strap a vessel under the horse's belly to collect its sweat and take some hairs from its tail. The prince follows the instructions and flees with the horse to another place. The horse falls down and dies, but, just as the horse instructed him, the prince dips a hair from its tail in the vessel and the horse revives, and brings with him his palace, pages and accommodations. The prince then goes to another city and finds work as the king's gardener's apprentice. The prince, named Filippeddu, makes floral arrangements and brings them to the three princesses. One night, the prince summons his horse and palace in front of the youngest princess's quarters; she wakes up, sees the commotion and, to confirm her suspicions, spies on him the next day. Some time later, she declares to her father she wants to marry Filippeddu. Despite the king's protests, the princess is allowed to marry him, but is expelled from the palace to live in the stables. The princess is also mocked for her choice of husband, while her sister marry princes. Time passes, and the kingdom enters a war. The king declares that whoever brings a banner shall be granted a royal title. Filippeddu rides a lame mule, then uses the horse's hair to ride a better mount, rides into battle and steals the banner. On the way back, he makes an offer to his first brother-in-law: the banner for his cut off little finger. The next day, the same thing happens: Filippeddu rides into battle, steals the banner of war and gives to his other brother-in-law in exchange for his little finger. Later, the king summons everyone for a banquet at the palace, where his elder daughters boast about their husbands. Filippeddu uses the horse's hair, and produces the cut off fingers as evidence of the brothers-in-law's deception.

South Slavic 
In a South Slavic tale published by Slavicist Friedrich Salomon Krauss with the title Das wunderbare Pferd ("The Wonderful Horse"), a countess is pregnant with child, and a mare in the stables is ready to foal. The countess gives birth to a boy, then dies, as well as the mare after it foals. The human boy grows up and becomes friends with the foal in the stables, which knows many things. As for the count, he marries another woman. One day, the woman feigns illness and asks for the horse's liver. The horse warns the boy of the step-mother's plot, and plans with him: the boy is to ask for a coat shining like the sun, then he is to ride the horse three times around the estate. The boy is given the sun-coat, and, after he rides the foal, both ride away from the count's manor. In another town, the foal gives the boy its bridle and advises him to find work, then rides away. The boy becomes a gardener at the king's court, and, one time, summons the horse to ride around the garden in his sun-coat - a scene that is witnessed by the princess. The princess falls in love with the gardener and withers with love for him. The royal doctors advise the king to marry her to the gardener. Much to his disgust, the king follows the doctors' prescribed treatment, and banishes her to live with the boy in a chicken coop. Later, war breaks out, and the gardener is given a lame mule. Before he reaches the battlefield, he gives the mule to a innkeeper for safekeeping, while he summons the horse, puts on the sun-coat and rides into battle to fight for the kingdom. An arrow injures the boy's hand, which the king bandages with a handkerchief.

Central Eerope

Poland 
In a Polish tale collected by Polish folklorist  with the title O synie króleskiem (Russian: "О королевском сыне"; English: "About the Royal Son"), while a king is away at war, a magician named Milojardyn turns the true queen into a mare and replaces her for his daughter. When the king comes back, the false queen conspires with the king to kill the prince. The boy comes back from school and goes to the stables to feed the mare, which tramples him and warns him against eating soup or sweets his "mother" may give him. The next time, they try to poison him with sweets again, and the third time with a special coat rigged to kill whoever wears it. Finally, the false queen scratches herself and blames the prince, which convinces the king to execute his son. The mare advises the boy to ask for a last ride on the horse before his execution, then he must gallop away from the kingdom. It happens thus, and the prince and mare ride away to another realm. The mare gives the prince a girdle to summon her and orders him to find work as a gardener, then flees. The prince hides his golden hair and astral mark on his chest, then hires himself to the king's gardener as an apprentice. One day, he prepares a bouquet of flowers and gives it to the youngest princess, who reciprocates by giving him her ring. Later, the second king arranges marriages for his three daughters, but the youngest princess only wants to marry the gardener. The prince summons the mare, wears an ugly disguise and goes to the king's court, where he is given the princess. Some time later, some princes, spurned by the princess, ally themselves and prepare to battle the kingdom. The third princess complains to her gardener husband, who agrees to fight for his father-in-law against the enemy princes. After two battles, the prince and the mare defeat the enemy princes and save the king, but he is hurt in a leg. The king bandages the mysterious knight with a handkerchief, but he departs back to the princess. Safely at home, the king sends for his third daughter and her husband, but, since they deny his orders, he goes to the gardener's quarters himself and, upon seeing the same bandage on the gardener's apprentice, realizes his son-in-law was the one that saved him. The gardener goes to the court and summons the mare with the bridle, which turns back into his mother, the true queen.

In a Polish tale collected by Oskar Kolberg from Tomaszowice with the title O dwóch jabłkach ("About Two Apples"), a childless couple prays to God to have a child. One night, the husband has a dream about an apple tree behind the stables. The next morning, the man finds the tree from his dream and plucks two apples, then goes to feed the horses, but a fruit falls to the ground and lands near a mare that eats it. The man returns with the other apple and gives it to his wife. A son is born to the couple and a colt to the mare. Seven years later, the boy goes to school, and whenever he goes back home he meets the apple-born colt instead of his mother, which greatly infuriates the latter, so much so she tries to kill her own son: first, she gives him poisoned food. The boy goes to check on the colt and finds him crying. The animal explains his own mother is trying to poison him, and he must toss the food away in a dung heap. The boy follows the animal's orders and buries the food; three days later, snakes and lizards appear in the dung heap. The boy then tells his father about his mother's attempt, and he allows the boy to leave and take the colt with him to the wide world. The boy rides the horse until he reaches a rock, which opens up for them for rest inside. The colt then tells the boy to wash his hair in the fountain; it turns to a golden colour. The colt advises the boy to hide his hair under a cap and go to the nearby castle to find a job as the gardener. The boy makes great bouquets for the king's three daughters, the youngest princess getting the most beautiful, to her sisters' envy. One day, the king sends the gardener to meet the queen, and he exposes his golden hair, which the youngest princess sees. Later, the king organizes a ball and summmons princes for his daughters to choose. During the ball, the princesses choose their husbands, the youngest choosing the gardener.

Czechia 
He complains to the tree that if it does not bear fruit, he will burn it. When he turns again, there are two apples on the tree. He takes the apples and gives one to his wife, while the other drops on the ground and rolls to the stables, where his mare eats it. A son is born to the man, while a foal is born to the mare. The boy, named Janeček, becomes friends with the foal and they talk to each other. Years later, while the man is away on business, Janeček's mother has an affair with a Jew, and together they plan to kill the boy: first, they try to poison his food; next, they give him a garment laced with poison. With the foal's warnings, Janeček avoid the danger. Finally, his father goes back home, and his wife spins a story that their son is only interested in playing with the horse instead of going to school, and issues an ultimatum: either the horse is sold, or she will leave him. Janeček visits his friend in the stables, and sees that he has not touched his food. The horse answers that the boy's father is readying a rifle to shoot him, but Janeček can save the horse: he is to ask for a last ride around the yard. Janeček follows the horse's instructions and gallops away from home into the forest, where they stop by a fountain. The horse asks Janeček to wash his mane with water from the fountain; and it becomes gold. Janeček also washes his hair in the fountain and his also turns of a golden colour. The horse advises Janeček to find work as a gardener to the king, while he will stay by a neaby cave. Janeček arrives at the castle and is hired as their gardener, but he is mocked as having scab due to the cap he wears on his head. One day, while he is at the garden, he takes of his cap to comb his hair, and the king's youngest daughter sees him and falls in love with the boy. Later, the king's elder daughters find suitable grooms for themselves, while the youngest expresses her wishes to marry the gardener. The king berates his daughter and threatens to banish him, to which the princess retorts she wil simply join him. Back to Janeček, on a Sunday, he dons princely clothes to go to church, where the king is, then returns to the cave where he left his horse and goes back to working in castle gardens. The king consents to his daughter's marriage to the gardener, and they move out to a small cottage. Later, war breaks out, and Janeček rides into battle with his knightly garments to defend his father-in-law's kingdom. After the battle, Janeček prepares to leave the battlefield, but the king tries to keep him there and accidentally stabs him in the leg. The king then returns to the castle for a grand feast, and goes to visit his daughter in their small cottage. Once there, he sees an ornately decorated house with gold and jewels, and his son-in-law, the gardener, with a leg injury. The king realizes the gardener was the knight and that he made a mistake. At the end of the tale, Janeček becomes king. The horse then asks him to cut off its head. Reluctantly, Janeček obeys his orders: the horse becomes a dove and flies to the sky.

Russia 
In a tale collected from a teller in Kuznetsky District with the title "Золотой конь" ("Golden Horse"), a merchant has a son that helps him in his store. One day, the son sees a golden-maned black horse next to a peasant and asks his father to buy it. The merchant bargains with the peasant for the animal and buys it to give to his son. The boy tends to the horse, feeds and grooms it. One day, he goes to the stables and sees the horse crying. The animal warns him not to eat any food he is given and throw it to the dog. The boy goes home and his mother gives him a dish, but he follows the horse's advice and throws away the food to the dog; it eats and dies. Next, the horse advises the boy to refuse a new shirt his mother may give him, and to hang it over the stove. The boy does as instructed and reptiles crawl out of the garment. The third time, the horse tells him his mother wishes to kill the horse to cure her. The boy goes to his mother's room, and is told she is sick and needs the horse's heart to regain health. The next morning, the horse is brought to be sacrificed, but the boy asks to ride a last time on the animal. He seizes the opportunity to gallop away to another kingdom. At a distance, the horse tells him to dismount and walk to the nearby kingdom of the serpent king ("змеиный царь"), where his three daughters are to choose their husbands in a public gathering, and says the boy can summon him by whistling three times. The merchant's son enters the kingdom and takes part in the husband selection: the elder princesses choose husbands for themselves, and the youngest chooses the merchant's son, to the assemblage's mocking laughter and the king's disgust. The princess remains steadfast in her decision, and asks her father to provide at least a chicken coop for them to live. Some time later, a large six-headed snake rises out of the sea and menaces the kingdom. The eldest princess is given to appease the beast, but the merchant's son summons his loyal horse, dons a golden furcoat and a golden saber, and saves his sister-in-law. The same events happen to the middle princess: she is given to a seven-headed serpent, but the merchant's son kills the monster to save her. Lastly, the youngest princess is given to a 17-headed serpent; the merchant's son rides the horse to save his wife and decapitates 16 of its heads, leaving only one intact, per the horse's advice. The serpent bites his hand, and the princess dresses his wound. The merchant's son follows the monster to its marine lair and they hold a truce. The serpent gives the merchant son's two magic eggs. The boy returns to land and tosses one of the eggs on the chicken coop: a large terem appears for him to reside in. Later, he asks his wife to invite the king over to the terem for a banquet. The king at first declines the invitation twice, since he knows his daughter lives in miserable conditions, but accepts on the third time and goes to have a drink with his son-in-law.

Mari people 
In a tale from the Mari people published by folklorist  with the title "Арап" ("Arap"), an old couple long to have a child. A witch gives the man an onion and advises him to give it to his wife. The woman eats it and throws the peels outside the window. Their mare eats the peels. Some time later, a boy is born to the couple and a foal to the mare. Seventeen years later, the man goes away on business and the wife is having an affair. She comments with her lover that she wants to get rid of her son, and the lover advises her to poison his food, and to give him a shirt that will kill him. With the foal's warnings, the boy escapes. Having failed twice, she feigns illness and asks for the foal's heart and lungs as remedy. When her husband returns, the woman convinces her husband to kill their son's horse. The boy asks for one last ride on the horse, then circles around their house for a few times. He shouts at his father that the woman has a lover, bids him goodbye, and rides away to the forest. At a safe distance, Ivan (the boy's name) reaches a meadow and goes to drink water form a pond. The horse advises Ivan to drink from the pond only once, but he does twice and his skin becomes dark. The horse then tells him to go on without him, but it will come to his aid. Later, Ivan, still looking like a dark-skinned person, goes to a nearby kingdom and finds work with the king under the name "Arap". First, the king orders him to fell down an old large oak; Ivan simply pushes its trunk to the ground. Next, the king sends him to the garden to uproot the old apple trees and plant new ones; with the help of the horse, Ivan fulfills the task. The king's third daughter, the princess, then declares she will marry the Arap, and, despite her sisters' complaints, insists on her decision. Some time later, war breaks out, and the king's two sons-in-law are drafted. Ivan (as "Arap") asks for a horse, for he will join them. Out of sight, he kills the horse and summons his loyal foal. The animal tells Ivan to enter its right ear and come out out its left ear; he becomes a handsome youth with gleaming golden armor. Ivan rushes to the battlefield, defeats the enemies, and, with a whip, strikes his the elder princesses' husbands, then flees back home to resume his Arap identity. The events happen twice more, and Ivan returns to his humble hut in the garden. After the third time, the horse tells Ivan he can ditch the Arap identity, and says farewell to him. Meanwhile, the youngest princess brings some food to the Arap in his hut, and sees a golden-maned horse galloping away from the hut. She enters the hut and sees normal Ivan. The boy tells he was the Arap, and explains he was the one who whipped the princess's brothers-in-law. She then introduces Ivan to the king, who agrees to marry them to each other.

Bashkir people 
In a tale from the Bashkirs translated into Russian language as "Златохвостый-Серебряногривый" ("Golden-Tailed, Silver-Maned"), an old couple live in poverty with their two daughters and a son named Кыдрас (Kydras), until one day they die and leave the siblings orphaned. Kydras finds work as a donkey keeper for a bai and takes the donkey for a bath in the river. He earns some money, but is sacked, and has to look for another job. After going through the forest and scaring away some wolves by setting fire to a haystack, he finally reaches another village, where he finds work as a horse keeper for another bai. The second bai has 34 mares and 6 stallions, but one of the mares, Юндузкашка (Yunduzkashka), sometimes disappers at night and foal somewhere. The bai makes an agreement with Kydras: if the boy can find out where the mare foals, he can get of the its colts. During the first three nights, Kydras watches over Yunduzkashka, but on the fourth the boy falls asleep and the mare escapes to the Aral Sea to foal. The next round of nights, Kydras manages to follow the runaway mare to the sea and spies on its foaling in the sea. Kydras manages to rescue a silver-maned, golden-tailed colt and bring it back to the bai. After three years, the colt becomes a fine stallion. However, the bai's wife falls ill and asks for the stallion's ribmeat as cure. Kydras pays a visit to the stallion in the stables to mourn over its potential death, and the horse begins to talk to the boy: since Kydras was the one that groomed and fed it, he can be the one to save it; it will neigh three times near the time of execution to alert him, and Kydras is to beg the bai for one last ride on the horse. After the evening prayers, Kydras follows the horse's plan and both ride away from the village and deep within the forest. At a safe distance, the horse gives Kydras some of its tail hairs, which can summon it if the youth needs its help, and gallops away. Kydras goes to a nearby house where an old couple lives; the old man is to bring apples to the three princesses. Kydras offers to go in his stead and takes the apples to the princesses: a rotten one for the eldest, a semi-rotten for the middle one, and a ripe for the youngest. The king thinks the presents are an outrage and sends for Kydras. The youth goes to the king's presence and explains that the apples represent their marriageability. Moved by the words, the king then sets a suitor selection test: the princesses will stand on a raised platform and throw their apples to their husbands of choice. The elder princess throws her to a soldier, the middle one to an officer, and the youngest to Kydras. Thinking his third daughter made a mistake, the king orders her to toss her apple again, and it still falls on Kydras's lot. Resigned, the king gives his elder daughters ivory palaces, and moves his youngest to an old hut. Later, the king falls ill, and only meat from the rib of a long-lived, 101-years-old owl can cure him. Kydras is given a lame horse to venture through the woods, but he summons the silver-maned, golden-tailed stallion and hunts the owl before his brothers-in-law. He cuts off the owls ribs, and waits for his brother-in-law. The duo see that Kydras got the owl and ask for its carcass; the youth agrees to trade for it, in exchange for Kydras cutting off some slices of flesh from the back of one of them. Kydras gives the wrong rib to the brothers-in-law, but saves the correct one for himself to give to the king. Later, the king needs the rib of another owl, this time from a 107-years-old one. Kydras finds the owl first, and, once again, his brothers-in-law come to the forest and ask for a share. Kydras agrees to the deal, in exchanging for branding the back of the other brother-in-law. Later, Kydras tells his wife he will go away for three months. He returns three months later with a new disguise: a fine knight mounted on the silver-maned, golden-tailed stallion. He jumps over the palace gates and meets the king, demanding his two soldiers: one with slices of flesh cut from his back, and the other with the branded back. The king, Kydras's father-in-law, sends for his two sons-in-law to placate the stranger. The third princess comes in and begs for her father. Kydras takes off his disguise and they recognize him.

Tatar people 
In a tale from the Tatar people titled "Пастушок" ("Pastushok"; "Shepherd Boy"), a padishah has a wife and a son. When the boy is but a teenager, his mother dies, and the padishah decides to gift him a foal. They look for a fine horse in the markets, but none please the boy, until he sees a shabby colt from a herd. The boy's father buys the colt from its owner and takes it to the palace. The boy takes care of the colt, feeds and grooms it until, three years later, the colt grows up to be a fine stallion, which the boy spends the days and plays with. Meanwhile, the padishah has remarried, but his new wife has been having an affair with a horseman, and the stallion tells the boy about it. The boy then goes to talk with his stepmother about the affair in hopes of dissuading her. The stepmother heeds his words, and convenes with her lover to discover who told him about their affair. A fortune-teller tells the pair the boy's horse is aware of the affair. The stepmother then hatches a plan: she feigns illness and asks from her husband the horse's heart as cure. The boy cries to the horse about its possible death, but the animal plots with him: the boy is to prepare provisions for the road; while the boy is at school (mektebe), the horse will neigh three times to alert him; he is to come before the third neigh and ask his father for one last ride on the animal. It happens thus: the boy circles the state three times and, whipping his horse, flees with him to the forest. While walking through the forest, the horse advises him to pick a tooth from a pile of tiger bones, and a tooth from a lions skeleton, then rides with him to another city. The animal then gives the boy three of its hairs, and tells him to rent a room in the city, then gallops away. The boy rents a room for a month, but, after his money wanes, he goes to the padishah of the city to ask for a job. The padishah agrees to hire him as a shepherd, and orders him to fatten the meagre sheep and cure the blind sheep. The boy grazes the sheep in the forest and meets an old man whom he confides in how he can fulfill the padishah's task. The old man assuages his fears and lets the boy spend some time with him and his two daughters. After three days, the flock of sheep is fat and healthy, and the old man's younger daughter gives the shepherd a magic handkerchief that grants whatever he wishes for (food, drinks, music, etc.). He reports back to the padishah, who congratulates him. The boy wishes for food and music from the handkerchief, and the padishah's youngest princess take notice of the music coming from his hut. The next day, while the shepherd is asleep, she creeps into the hut and steals the handkerchief. On the same day, the padishah orders the boy to fatten an ever large flock, this time of two thousand sheep. The boy goes back to the old man in the forest, who gives him a magic box and helps him in this new task. Later, padishahs from neighbouring kingdoms begin a conflict to kidnap the three princesses and marry them. They first come for the first princess, but the boy drops the tiger's tooth on the ground near the battlefield: a horde of tigers appears and maims the enemy army, leaving the way open for him, on his own loyal horse, to capture the first padishah's son. Under the guise of a mysterious knight, the prince brings the prisoner to the princess's father as proof of his deed. The next time, he captures the second padishah's son. The third time, he defeats the enemy army and hurts his finger, which the youngest princess bandages with her scarf. To celebrate his victory, he summons all generals and the populace for his daughters to choose their husbands: the elder chooses a young general, the middle one another general, and the youngest the shepherd. The padishah marries his elder daughters in grand weddings, and banishes his youngest to live in the barn with the shepherd. Some time later, he falls ill, and only swan meat can cure him; whoever brings it, shall rule after him. The boy summons his horse again, which warns him that the swan meat will not cure him, but its innards will. With that in mind, the shepherd finds and kills the swan and cut open his insides. His brothers-in-law appear soon after and, not recognizing him, ask for the swan. He agrees with a deal, in swan meat in exchanging for cutting off a finger from one of them and branding the back of the other. The brothers-in-law take the swan and give to the padishah, whose health does not improve until he eats a dish made of the swan's innards. Finally, the padishah summons the entire kingdom to make his choice known: one of the two generals, or the shepherd. The shepherd claims he brought the swan meat, and points to the generals' missing finger snd the brand. The padishah then makes his shepherd son-in-law as his successor.

Latvia 
A similar story is found in Latvia, indexed as type 532, Kumeļš palīdz zēnam ("Colt helps the hero"): the hero's stepmother intends to hurt her stepson, but, with the help of the colt, he survives. The boy asks his father for a last ride on the colt and escapes with him to another kingdom, where he finds work as a gardener or a cook. In performing great deeds (e.g., fighting in the war), he marries the youngest princess.

Caucasus Region

Azerbaijan 
In an Azeri tale titled "Али-хань" ("Ali-khan"), in a certain kingdom, lives a rich merchant called Gadzhi-Murad with his wife Gulistan-khanum and son Ali-khan, who has silver hair and golden hair. When his father leaves on a business trip, he gifts his son a special black horse that can talk and knows the secrets of men. Whenever he can, Ali-khan consults with the animal. After her husband leaves, the boy's mother conspires with a paramour named Gamzat-bek to kill her husband and the horse, who can divulge their illicit affair. Aware of the danger, the black horse tells Ali-khan and advises the boy to ask for a last ride on the horse, three times around the property. Following the horse's plan, they seize the opportunity to kill Gulistan-khanum and flee to another kingdom. Ali-khan trades clothes with a beggar, hides his hair under a cap, calls himself "Kechal", then finds work as apprentice to the gardener of local king Ali-Mamed-khan. One day, he fashions bouquets for the three princesses (Guluzar-khanum, Asia-khanum and Khurshid-khanum), the youngest gets the most elaborate. Later, the princesses take part in a suitor selection ceremony by throwing apples to their intended; Guluzar-khanum, the eldest, to the vizier's son; Asia-khanum, the middle one, to the vekil's son; and Khurshid-khanum, the youngest, to Kechal. They marry. Some time later, Ali-Mamed-khan falls ill, and only venison meat can cure him. His three sons-in-law ride off to find venison, and Kechal finds it first. He dons fine garments and meets his brothers-in-law en route to the palace, and agress to share the venison with them, in exchange for him branding their cheeks. The king is given the correct meat by Kechal and is cured. Next, a war erupts; Kechal summons the horse and defeats the enemies, getting hurt in battle and having his injury bandaged by the king. Ali-Mamed-khan goes to visit his daughter Khurshid-khanum and sees the bandage on Kechal's hand, finally realizing he was the one that saved the kingdom.

In an Azeri tale titled "Похождения мальчика" ("Adventures of a Boy"), a boy is very devoted to his friend, the horse, much to his mother's chagrin. She decides to apart the boy from the horse once and for all, by feigning illness and asking for horse meat as cure. The boy confides in the horse, which talks in a human voice that his father will sacrifice it, and hatches a plan with the boy: the boy is to come home from school, when he will hear the horse neighing for him; the boy is to ask for a ride, and, by whipping it, they will run off to any other place. It happens so: the boy and the horse ride away to another kingdom. On his journey, the boy saves a tiger and a lion from choking on their food, and in return they give the boy one of their cubs as companions. The retinue goes along the road; the cubs agree to look after the boy's horse while the human goes to look for a job in the city. The boy hires himself as apprentice to the royal gardener. One day, he summons his animal friends by clapping and rides around the garden - a scene that is seen by the king's youngest princess. The next day, the princesses deliver some melons to their father as a metaphor for their marriageability, and a suitor selection test is prepared for them: the princesses are to throw apples at their intended suitors. The elder throws her to the vizier's son, the middle one to the vekil's son, and the youngest to the gardener's apprentice. The youngest princess repeats the action and confirms her choice, to the king's disgust, who banishes her from the palace. Some time later, the king falls ill, and only deer meat can cure him. The three sons-in-law ride off to find deer meat, and the boy, with the aid of his animal companions (the tiger and the lion), catches the best meat to give to the king. Lastly, war erupts, and the king rides to battle. When his army is surrounded, the boy appears with the tiger and the lion and defeats the enemy army. He is injured in the left hand, and the king bandages him. At the end of the tale, the king prepares a grand celebratory feast and invites every person, and those that do not come are to be taken to the feast. The gardener's apprentice is taken to the banquet and, when he washes his hands, the king realizes he was the warrior at the battlefield. The compiler classified the tale as types 554 and 314, and located its source as collected in 1930, in Nakhkray (Nakhchivan Autonomous Republic). A nearly identical tale, titled "Приключения мальчика" ("Adventures of a Boy"), was collected in Nukha and published in 1904.

In an Azeri tale titled "Черный конь" ("Black Horse"), a padishah has a son named Ibrahim. His wife dies and he marries another woman and fathers a son with her. The padishah then sends his two sons to school, and, after Ibrahim graduates, he gives his horses to the poor. One day, Ibrahim sees an old man guiding a black horse. He buys the animal and takes it with him to the stables, where he feeds it sweets. Meanwhile, the padishah's new wife, feeling that her husband loves his first wife's son instead of their child, begins to plot ways to kill her stepson: first, she gives poison to the cook to put it in Ibrahim's food; next, she tries to poison his sherbet. Ibrahim's black horse warns him against both attempts, and the boy avoids the danger. Her plans failing twice, the stepmother dyes her own skin to pretend she has jaundice, and her doctor lies to the padishah she needs to wrap her body in the black horse's hide to restore her health. The padishah tells Ibrahim they need to sacrifice his black horse, and the boy asks his father for one last ride on the animal with the saddle that belonged to his grandfather, Shah Mirza. Ibrahim rides on the animal and tells his father his stepmother's ploy, then gallops away from the kingdom. The padishah then orders his wife and the doctor to be executed. Back to Ibrahim, on the road, he sees a nest of Zumrut's chicks about to be attacked by a snake-like being named azhdaha, and kills the latter. The bird Zumrut appears and, in gratitude, offers one of its chicks to Ibrahim. Next, the boy helps an injured tiger in the forest and gains another companion. The group then make their way to a city swarming with troops, and Ibrahim learns they are to pay tribute to the local padishah, or to take princess Khurshud. Ibrahim decides to go into the city, and his black horse gives him some of its hair to summon him. The boy takes shelter with an old woman, then summons his black horse to defeat the enemy army, getting hurt in the process. The local padishah learns of the mysterious saviour, the man on the black horse, and summons him to his presence. The padishah's daughter, Khurshud, recognizes Ibrahim as the son of Shah Shongar, and they marry. The compiler classified the tale as types 554 and 314, and sourced it from a teller in the village of Bilgəh, in Baku.

See also
 Fire Boy (Japanese folktale)
 The Boy with the Moon on his Forehead
 Kaloghlan (Turkish folk hero)
 The Princess on the Glass Hill
 Iron Hans
 The Horse Lurja
 The Turtle Prince (folktale)
 Sang Thong

Footnotes

References 

Persian fairy tales
Horses in literature
Horses in culture
ATU 300-399